Gracin is a surname. Notable people with the surname include:

 Josh Gracin (born 1980), American musician
 Zdravko Gracin (born 1951), Croatian rower

See also
 Gracie (name)